"The Joker" is a song by the Steve Miller Band from their 1973 album The Joker. Released as a single in October 1973, the song topped the US Billboard Hot 100 in early 1974 and reached the top 20 in Australia, Canada, and the Netherlands. More than 16 years later, in September 1990, "The Joker" reached number one on the UK Singles Chart for two weeks after being used in "Great Deal", a Hugh Johnson-directed television advertisement for Levi's, thus holding the record for the longest gap between transatlantic chart-toppers. This reissue of "The Joker" also topped the Irish Singles Chart, the New Zealand Singles Chart, the Dutch Nationale Top 100, and the Dutch Top 40.

English musician Fatboy Slim covered "The Joker" and released it as a single on February 28, 2005. This version reached number 32 on the UK Singles Chart and number 29 in Ireland.

Lyrics
Miller borrowed from the hit song "Lovey Dovey", which shares the lyric, "You're the cutest thing that I ever did see / I really love your peaches, wanna shake your tree / Lovey dovey, lovey dovey, lovey dovey all the time". Ahmet Ertegun wrote the song, and the Clovers had the highest charting version in 1954.

It is one of two Steve Miller Band songs that feature the nonce word "pompatus". The first line of the lyrics is a reference to the song "Space Cowboy" from Miller's Brave New World album. The following lines refer to two other songs: "Gangster of Love" from Sailor and "Enter Maurice" from Recall the Beginning...A Journey from Eden. The line "some people call me Maurice / 'Cause I speak of the pompatus of love" was written after Miller heard the song "The Letter" by the Medallions. In "The Letter", writer Vernon Green made up the word puppetutes, meaning a paper-doll erotic fantasy figure; however, Miller misheard the word and wrote pompatus instead.

Critical reception
Cash Box said that "The Joker" "is going all the way to become [Miller's] most successful release ever."

Chart performance
"The Joker" topped the UK Singles Chart upon its reissue in 1990 despite selling exactly the same number of copies as that week's number-two single, "Groove Is in the Heart" by Deee-Lite. Due to a ruling that the higher position should go to the single that had increased its sales most over the week, "The Joker" controversially secured top spot, having grown its sales by 57% compared to Deee-Lite's 37%. It later transpired that a rounding discrepancy had initially caused the tie, with "The Joker" selling eight more copies and topping the charts on merit.

Track listings
7-inch single (1973)
 "The Joker" – 3:36
 "Something to Believe In" – 4:40

7-inch single (1983 – live version)
 "The Joker" (live) – 2:55
 "Take the Money and Run" (live) – 3:49

7-inch single (1990)
 "The Joker" (single version) – 3:34
 "Don't Let Nobody Turn You Around" – 2:27

12-inch maxi (1990)
 "The Joker" (LP version) – 4:22
 "Don't Let Nobody Turn You Around" – 2:27
 "Shu Ba Da Du Ma Ma Ma" – 5:39

CD maxi (1990)
 "The Joker" (single version) – 3:34
 "Don't Let Nobody Turn You Around" – 2:27
 "Shu Ba Da Du Ma Ma Ma Ma" – 3:33
 "Living in the U.S.A." – 3:59

Personnel
 Steve Miller – guitar, lead vocals
 Gerald Johnson – bass, backing vocals
 Dick Thompson – organ
 John King – drums

Charts

Weekly charts

Year-end charts

Certifications

References

External links
 The Straight Dope: In Steve Miller's "The Joker," what is "the pompatus of love"?
 Language Log: Dismortality and puppetutes—post on the etymology of "pompatus".

1973 singles
1973 songs
1974 singles
1990 singles
2007 singles
Astralwerks singles
Billboard Hot 100 number-one singles
Cashbox number-one singles
Capitol Records singles
Dutch Top 40 number-one singles
Fatboy Slim songs
Irish Singles Chart number-one singles
Number-one singles in New Zealand
Songs about cannabis
Songs written by Ahmet Ertegun
Songs written by Eddie Curtis
Songs written by Steve Miller (musician)
Steve Miller Band songs
Tim McGraw songs
UK Singles Chart number-one singles
Warner Records singles
Song recordings produced by Steve Miller